Halland may refer to:
Halland, historic province in Sweden
Halland County, Sweden
Halland, East Sussex, a village in East Hoathly with Halland parish, East Sussex, England
, several ships of the Swedish Navy
, two ships built for the Swedish Navy in the 1950s